The Water Tower Stuttgart Degerloch is a bricked water tower in Stuttgart-Degerloch, Germany.

The tower was built in 1911/1912 and is 28 metres high. It has a diameter of 10.9 metres, a height of 28 metres and a container volume of 400 m³. 

During World War II the water tower provided a marking point by the allied planes for the bombing of the heavy anti aircraft flak battery in Degerloch. This scenario prompted the authorities to blast three metres from the top of the water tower to bring its height even with the height level of the trees nearby thus  blending the towers appearance in with the forest.

External links
 

Towers completed in 1912
Buildings and structures in Stuttgart
Water towers in Germany
1912 establishments in Germany